Mohammad-Vali Gharani (1913–23 April 1979) was an Iranian military officer. He was born in Tehran in 1913. He graduated from the Officers' Academy and the War College. In 1950 he joined the Imperial Army and was promoted to the rank of colonel. Then he was appointed to Rasht as a garrison commander.

By August 1953, Gharani was commander of the Rasht Brigade and loyal to the Shah. He met with Ardeshir Zahedi and helped 1953 Iranian coup d'état. Following the coup, he was promoted to vice Chief-of-Staff. In 1957, when SAVAK was established, he reportedly was a candidate to take office as head of the newly established secret service. Gharani however had become increasingly critical of regime due to 'endemic corruption' over the past years, unbeknownst to the authorities. He planned a coup d'état against the regime which was exposed, leading to dishonorable discharge in 1958. He was imprisoned twice in 1958 and 1963.

Gharani served as the first Chief-of-Staff of the Iranian Army after the Iranian Revolution, from 12 February 1979 to 27 March 1979, when he was forced out. He was assassinated on 23 April 1979 by Forqan Group.

References

External links

20th-century Iranian politicians
1913 births
1979 deaths
Assassinated military personnel
Assassinated Iranian people
Council of the Islamic Revolution members
Deaths by firearm in Iran
Islamic Republic of Iran Army major generals
People assassinated by the Furqan Group
People of the Iranian Revolution
Burials at Fatima Masumeh Shrine
Politicians from Tehran